Gaston Stronck (born 15 December 1957 in Echternach) is a retired Luxembourgish diplomat. Currently he is a Business consultant in Luxembourg supporting European and US companies.

He was the Ambassador of Luxembourg to the United States of America from 2019 to 2021. He presented his credentials to President Donald Trump on September 16, 2019. Before taking his post in Washington D.C., he was Secretary general at the Ministry of Foreign and European Affairs of Luxembourg from 2017 to 2019. He was Director for International Economic Relations and European Affairs at the Ministry of Foreign Affairs from 2014 to 2017.  He was Ambassador of Luxembourg to India from 2011 to 2014.  He presented his credentials to President Pratibha Devisingh Patil on November 1, 2011.  He was Ambassador to the Russian Federation, Kazakhstan and Belarus from 2007 to 2011.  He presented his credentials to Russian President Vladimir Putin on 11 December 2007.

Before Moscow, Gaston Stronck was Ambassador of Luxembourg to Denmark, Finland, Norway and Sweden (2003-2007) and the first Ambassador of Luxembourg to the Political and Security Committee (PSC) of the European Union (EU) (2000-2003).

He is a former associate professor of the European Institute of Public Administration (EIPA) in Maastricht and a former special guest at the Brookings Institution in Washington DC.

He holds a Ph.D. in History and Defence Studies of the University of Montpellier. In June 2010 he became Doctor h.c. of the Moscow State Linguistic University (MGLU).  He speaks Luxembourgish, French, German, English, Dutch and Russian.

References

Living people
Ambassadors of Luxembourg to Russia
Ambassadors of Luxembourg to India
Ambassadors of Luxembourg to Kazakhstan
Ambassadors of Luxembourg to Belarus
Ambassadors of Luxembourg to Denmark
Ambassadors of Luxembourg to Finland
Ambassadors of Luxembourg to Sweden
Ambassadors of Luxembourg to Norway
1957 births